
Gmina Górzyca is a rural gmina (administrative district) in Słubice County, Lubusz Voivodeship, in western Poland, on the German border.

Villages
Gmina Górzyca contains the villages and settlements of Chyrzyno, Czarnów, Górzyca, Laski Lubuskie, Ługi Górzyckie, Owczary, Pamięcin, Radówek, Spudłów, Stańsk, Żabczyn and Żabice.

Neighbouring gminas
Gmina Górzyca is bordered by the town of Kostrzyn nad Odrą and by the gminas of Ośno Lubuskie, Rzepin, Słońsk and Słubice. It also borders Germany.

References

Gorzyca
Słubice County